Kočište is a village in the municipality of Demir Hisar, North Macedonia.

Demographics
In statistics gathered by Vasil Kanchov in 1900, the village of Kočište was inhabited by 200 Muslim Albanians and 120 Christian Bulgarians.

According to the 2002 census, the village had a total of 266 inhabitants. Ethnic groups in the village include:

Macedonians 38

References

Villages in Demir Hisar Municipality